Into the Dark is an American horror anthology streaming television series produced for Hulu. The first season premiered on October 5, 2018, and consists of twelve feature-length episodes of television films. Into the Dark was renewed for a second season, which premiered on October 4, 2019, and also consists of twelve episodes.

The series is produced by the television branch of Blumhouse Productions, with founder Jason Blum executive producing every episode. Each episode features its own ensemble casts and director, with directors including Patrick Lussier, Nacho Vigalondo, Sophia Takal, Daniel Stamm, James Roday Rodriguez and Gigi Saul Guerrero contributing installments.

Into the Dark was ordered in January 2018, and has been met with a positive response from critics upon its premiere. Each episode has starred different actors, including Tom Bateman, Dermot Mulroney, Diana Silvers, Nyasha Hatendi, Suki Waterhouse, Matt Lauria, Jimmi Simpson, Keir O'Donnell, Israel Broussard, Aurora Perrineau, Clayne Crawford, Martha Higareda, Corey Fogelmanis, Jude Demorest, Jahkara Smith, Adelaide Kane, Reign Edwards, Britt Baron, Giorgia Whigham, Felicia Day, Tina Majorino, Judy Greer, Barry Watson, Dana Drori, and Megalyn Echikunwoke.

Premise
The theme of each episode is inspired by a holiday during the month of its release.

Episodes

Season 1 (2018–19)

Season 2 (2019–21)

Production
On January 9, 2018, it was announced that Hulu had ordered a first season of twelve episodes. Each episode was set to be released one month apart beginning in October 2018. The series' first twelve episodes were expected to function as standalone stories though some narrative device or structural device was expected to connect them.

On May 2, 2018, it was announced that the series had been titled Into the Dark and would premiere on October 5, 2018. Davis and Fisher were announced as the Producers and Alexa Faigen as Executive Producer. On October 11, 2018, Production Designer Cecil Gentry revealed in an interview with Dead Entertainment that he was working on ten out of twelve episodes of the series.

In August 2019, Into the Dark was renewed for a second season. Hulu ordered nine further episodes in addition to the fifteen already ordered, bringing the total to 24 episodes. Alexander Koehne and Lauren Downey were announced as Co-Showrunners and Executive Producers. The twelve-episode second season premiered on October 4, 2019, and was originally scheduled to run through September 2020, after the first season concluded in September 2019. The August and September 2020 episodes were put on hold due to the COVID-19 pandemic; they had been filmed by November 2020, and premiered in February and March 2021.

Release

Marketing
On September 13, 2018, the first trailer for the series was released.

Premiere
On September 21, 2018, the series held its world premiere during the annual LA Film Festival in Los Angeles, California with a screening of the episode "The Body" at the Writers Guild Theater. The episode "I'm Just Fucking with You" held its world premiere during the 2019 South by Southwest film festival in Austin, Texas as a part of the festival's "Narrative Spotlight" series of screenings.

Distribution
On October 11, 2018, it was announced that Sony Pictures Television had acquired the international rights to the series. Sony was expected to take the series out for sale internationally and begin its sale effort at the Mipcom market in Cannes the following week.

Reception
The series has been met with a positive response from critics upon its premiere. On the review aggregation website Rotten Tomatoes, the series holds a 69% approval rating.

The first season holds 68% approval rating with an average rating of 5.6/10 based on 163 reviews. The website's critical consensus reads, "Into the Dark is a worthy horror anthology, offering viewers a selection of frightening and witty gothic tales like a tray of cobwebbed bonbons, making for a spooky Halloween treat." The second season holds a 71% approval rating with an average rating of 8.00/10 based on 120 reviews.

Notes

References

External links
 
 

2010s American anthology television series
2010s American horror television series
2018 American television series debuts
2020s American anthology television series
2020s American horror television series
2021 American television series endings
English-language television shows
Hulu original programming